A regional election will be held in Azores no later than October 2024, to determine the composition of the Legislative Assembly of the Autonomous Region of Azores. The election will replace all 57 members of the Azores Assembly, and the new members will then elect the President of the Autonomous Region.

The current president, José Manuel Bolieiro from the Social Democratic Party, is currently leading a coalition government between the Social Democrats and the CDS – People's Party and People's Monarchist Party, with the parliamentary support of CHEGA. The Liberal Initiative initially supported the PSD coalition government but withdrew their support from the government on 8 March 2022. The Social Democrats, the CDS – People's Party and the People's Monarchist Party will contest this election in a joint coalition as stipulated in their 2020 coalition agreement.

Background

2023 government crisis
The PSD/CDS/PPM coalition government was, since the beginning, marred by unstability due to political tensions between or within parties, specially CHEGA, which, already lost a member of the regional Parliament in the meantime. But, on 8 March 2023, the Liberal Initiative (IL) decided to remove their support from the government, citting deep disagreements on policy and tensions between the minor parties within the coalition, CDS and PPM particularly. Shortly after, the Independent member, a CHEGA dissident, Carlos Furtado, also withdrew his support from the government accusing the government of lack of institutional respect and for failing to follow the deal between them and Furtado.

Following these announcements, that makes the government lose its majority, President José Manuel Bolieiro rejected the idea of a motion of confidence and said that he will continue to govern, but that elections could be on the table. The PS, the main opposition party, discussed the possibility of presenting a Motion of no confidence against the government, but the idea was dropped, and the PSD coalition government will govern as a minority and negotiate case by case with parties.

Electoral system

The Azores regional parliament elects 57 members through a proportional system in which the 9 islands elect a number of MPs proportional to the number of registered voters. MPs are allocated by using the D'Hondt method. 5 members are also elected for a Compensation constituency. Current distribution of MPs by constituency:

Parties

Current composition
The table below lists parties represented in the Legislative Assembly of the Azores before the election.

Opinion polls

See also
Azores

Notes

References

External links
Comissão Nacional de Eleições
ERC - Official publication of polls

2024 in Portugal
Regional elections in the Azores
Future elections in Portugal
Azores